Moctezuma de Orizaba was a Mexican football team that played in the Liga Mexicana de Football Amateur Association prior to the professionalization and development of the Mexican first division. The club was based in the city of Orizaba and folded in 1950.

History
The club was founded in 1932 by workers from the Moctezuma brewery in Orizaba Veracruz. The team was created to play sports in their spare time and once the owner of the brewery saw the men he decided to sponsor the club and so the club took on the brewery name Club Moctezuma de Orizaba and joined the amateur league in Veracruz.

Moctezuma club is remembered for being the first club from Veracruz to play in the amateur league in Mexico City, when they joined the league in 1940.

Honours

Campeón de Campeones (1): 1947
Copa México (2): 1942–43, 1946–47

References
article on former player "Fello" Meza

See also
Football in Mexico
Albinegros de Orizaba
Works team 

Defunct football clubs in Veracruz
Association football clubs established in 1932
1932 establishments in Mexico
1950 disestablishments in Mexico
Association football clubs disestablished in 1950
Primera Fuerza teams